Jari Juhani Halonen (born 30 September 1962) is a Finnish film and theatre director, writer and occasional actor. Known as a controversial and outspoken person, his films, such as Lipton Cockton in the Shadows of Sodoma (1995) and Joulubileet (1996), have garnered a cult following while also having been met with mixed reception by critics.

Selected filmography

As a director
Back to the USSR – takaisin Ryssiin (1992)
Lipton Cockton in the Shadows of Sodoma (1995)
Joulubileet (1996)
Aleksis Kiven elämä (2002)
Kalevala – Uusi aika (2013)

As an actor
Vares – yksityisetsivä (2004)

References

External links

1962 births
Finnish film directors
Finnish theatre directors
Finnish male film actors
Living people